Leslie William Nielsen  (11 February 192628 November 2010) was a Canadian actor and comedian. With a career spanning 60 years, he appeared in more than 100 films and 150 television programs, portraying more than 220 characters.

Nielsen was born in Regina, Saskatchewan. After high school, he enlisted in the Royal Canadian Air Force in 1943 and served until the end of World War II. Upon his discharge, Nielsen worked as a disc jockey before receiving a scholarship to study theatre at the Neighborhood Playhouse. He made his acting debut in 1950, appearing in 46 live television programs a year. Nielsen made his film debut in 1956, with supporting roles in several dramas and western and romance films produced between the 1950s and the 1970s.

Although his notable performances in the films Forbidden Planet and The Poseidon Adventure gave him standing as a serious actor, Nielsen later gained enduring recognition for his deadpan comedy roles during the 1980s, after being cast for the Zucker, Abrahams and Zucker comedy film Airplane!. In his comedy roles, Nielsen specialized in portraying characters oblivious to and complicit in their absurd surroundings. Nielsen's performance in Airplane! marked his turning point, which made him "the Olivier of spoofs" according to film critic Roger Ebert, and leading to further success in the genre with The Naked Gun film series, based on the earlier short-lived television series Police Squad!, in which Nielsen also starred. Nielsen received a variety of awards and was inducted into Canada's Walk of Fame and the Hollywood Walk of Fame.

Early life
Nielsen was born on 11 February 1926 in Regina, Saskatchewan. His mother, Mabel Elizabeth ( Davies), was an immigrant from Wales, and his father, Ingvard Eversen Nielsen (1900–1975), was a Danish-born constable in the Royal Canadian Mounted Police. Nielsen was born the second of two boys to both his parents. His elder brother, Erik Nielsen (1924–2008), was a long-time Canadian Member of Parliament, cabinet minister, and Deputy Prime Minister of Canada from 1984 to 1986. He also has a half-brother, Gilbert Nielsen, from his father's other relationship.

Nielsen's half-uncle Jean Hersholt was an actor known for his portrayal of Dr. Christian in a radio series of that title, and the subsequent television series and films. In a 1994 Boston Globe article, Nielsen explained, "I did learn very early that when I would mention my uncle, people would look at me as if I were the biggest liar in the world. Then I would take them home and show them 8-by-10 glossies, and things changed quite drastically. So I began to think that maybe this acting business was not a bad idea, much as I was very shy about it and certainly without courage regarding it. My uncle died not too long after I was in a position to know him. I regret that I had not a chance to know him better."

Nielsen lived for several years in Fort Norman (now Tulita) in the Northwest Territories, where his father was with the Royal Canadian Mounted Police. His father was an abusive man who beat his wife and sons, and Leslie longed to escape. Following graduation from Victoria High School (later renamed Victoria School of the Arts) in Edmonton, he enlisted in the Royal Canadian Air Force at age 17 in 1943, though he was legally deaf (he wore hearing aids most of his life). There he trained as an aerial gunner during World War II. However, he was too young to be fully trained or sent overseas. Upon the war's end, Nielsen was discharged and worked briefly as a disc jockey at a Calgary, Alberta, radio station, before enrolling at the Lorne Greene Academy of Radio Arts in Toronto. 

While studying in Toronto, Nielsen received a scholarship to the Neighborhood Playhouse. He noted, "I couldn't refuse, but I must say when you come from the land of the snow goose, the moose, and wool to New York, you're bringing every ton of hayseed and country bumpkin that you packed. As long as I didn't open my mouth, I felt a certain security. But I always thought I was going to be unmasked: 'OK, pack your stuff.' 'Well, what's the matter?' 'We've discovered you have no talent; we're shipping you back to Canada. 

He moved to New York City for his scholarship, studying theatre and music at the Neighborhood Playhouse, while performing in summer stock theatre. Afterward, he attended the Actors Studio, until his first television appearance in 1950 on an episode of Studio One, alongside Charlton Heston, for which he was paid $75.

Career

Early career

Nielsen's career began in dramatic roles on television during "Television's Golden Age", appearing in 46 live programs in 1950 alone. He said there "was very little gold, we only got $75 or $100 per show." He narrated documentaries and commercials and most of his early work as a dramatic actor was uneventful. Hal Erickson of Allmovie noted that "much of Nielsen's early work was undistinguished; he was merely a handsome leading man in an industry overstocked with handsome leading men." 

In 1956, he made his feature-film debut in the Michael Curtiz-directed musical film The Vagabond King. In the Seattle Post-Intelligencer, Nielsen remembered Curtiz as "a sadist, a charming sadist, but a sadist". Nielsen called this film The Vagabond Turkey. Though the film was not a success, producer Nicholas Nayfack offered him an audition for the science-fiction film Forbidden Planet, resulting in Nielsen's taking a long contract with Metro-Goldwyn-Mayer (MGM).

Forbidden Planet became an instant success, and roles in other MGM films such as Ransom! (1956), The Opposite Sex (1956) and Hot Summer Night (1957) followed. In 1957, he won the lead role opposite Debbie Reynolds in the romantic comedy Tammy and the Bachelor, which, as a Chicago Tribune critic wrote in 1998, made people consider Nielsen a dramatic actor and handsome romantic lead. However, dissatisfied with the films he was offered, calling the studios "a Tiffany, which had forgotten how to make silver", Nielsen left MGM after auditioning for Messala in the 1959 Ben-Hur. Stephen Boyd got the role. 

After leaving the studios, Nielsen landed the lead role in the Disney miniseries The Swamp Fox, as American Revolutionary War hero Francis Marion. In a 1988 interview, he reflected on the series, saying, "That was a great experience, because the Disney people didn't do their shows like everyone else, knocking out an episode a week. ... We only had to do an episode a month, and the budgets were extremely high for TV at that time. We had location shooting rather than cheap studio backdrops, and very authentic costumes." Eight episodes were produced and aired between 1959 and 1961.

His television appearances include Justice, Alfred Hitchcock Presents, Voyage to the Bottom of the Sea, Wagon Train, Gunsmoke, The Virginian, and The Wild Wild West. In 1961, he was the lead in a Los Angeles police drama called The New Breed. He guest-starred in a 1964 episode of Daniel Boone with Fess Parker in a minor but credited role. In 1968, he had a major role in the pilot for the police series Hawaii Five-O, and appeared in one of the seventh-season episodes. In 1969, he had the leading role as a police officer in The Bold Ones: The Protectors.

In 1972, Nielsen appeared as the ship's captain in The Poseidon Adventure. He also starred in the William Girdler's 1977 action film, Project: Kill. His last dramatic role before mainly comedy roles was the 1979 Canadian disaster film City on Fire, in which he played a corrupt mayor. In 1980, he guest-starred as Sinclair on the CBS miniseries The Chisholms.

Comedy: Airplane! and The Naked Gun

In an early comedic appearance, Nielsen appeared on M*A*S*H in 1973 as the title character in "The Ringbanger." 

Nielsen's supporting role of Dr. Rumack in Zucker, Abrahams, and Zucker's 1980's Airplane! was a turning point in his career. The film, a parody of disaster films such as Zero Hour! and Airport, was based on building a comedy around actors known for dramatic roles. Other stars included Robert Stack, Peter Graves, and Lloyd Bridges. Nielsen's deadpan delivery contrasted with the absurdity surrounding him. When asked, "Surely you can't be serious?", he responded with a curt, "I am serious. And don't call me Shirley." In several interviews, he reflected on the line: "I thought it was amusing, but it never occurred to me that it was going to become a trademark. It's such a surprise ... the thing comes out, people say, 'What did he say?! 

Nielsen said he was "pleased and honoured that [he] had a chance to deliver that line." As of 2010, the comedic exchange was at number 79 on the American Film Institute's AFI's 100 Years...100 Movie Quotes. The American Film Institute included the film in its list of the top-10 comedy films of all time in 2008, and a 2007 survey in the United Kingdom judged it the second-greatest comedy film of all time. In 2012, Empire voted it number one in the 50 Funniest Comedies Ever poll. Critics praised the film, which also proved a long-term success with audiences. In 2010, Airplane! was selected for preservation in the National Film Registry by the Library of Congress.

The directors cast Nielsen for his ability to play like "a fish in water", saying "You could have cast funny people and done it with everybody winking, goofing off, and silly ... we wanted people to be oblivious to the comedy." For Nielsen, Airplane! marked a shift from dramatic roles to deadpan comedy. When it was suggested his role in Airplane! was against type, Nielsen protested that he had "always been cast against type before", and that comedy was what he always wanted to do. The same directors cast Nielsen in a similar style, in their TV series Police Squad!. The series introduced Nielsen as Frank Drebin, the stereotypical police officer modelled after serious characters in earlier police series.

Police Squad'''s opening sequence was based on the 1950s show M Squad, which starred Lee Marvin, and opened with footage of a police car roving through a dark urban setting with a big band playing a jazz song in the background. The Hank Simms voice-over and the show's organization into acts with an epilogue was homage to Quinn Martin police dramas including The Fugitive, The Streets of San Francisco, Barnaby Jones, The F.B.I., and Cannon. Nielsen portrayed a serious character whose one-liners appeared accidental next to the pratfalls and sight gags that were happening around him. Although the show lasted only six episodes, Nielsen received an Emmy Award nomination for Outstanding Lead Actor in a Comedy Series.

Six years after cancellation of Police Squad!, the film The Naked Gun: From the Files of Police Squad! returned Nielsen to his role as Frank Drebin. It involved a ruthless drug king trying hypnosis to assassinate Queen Elizabeth II. Nielsen did many of his own stunts: "You have an idea of how you're going to do something, and it's your vision ... unless you do it, it really doesn't stand a chance." This movie grossed over $78 million and was well received by critics. Ebert's –star review (out of four) noted, "You laugh, and then you laugh at yourself for laughing."The Naked Gun spawned two sequels: The Naked Gun 2½: The Smell of Fear (1991) and Naked Gun : The Final Insult (1994). The Naked Gun 2½ grossed more than the original, with $86.9 million, while  grossed $51.1 million. Nielsen remained open to a fourth Naked Gun film, although he doubted that it would be produced — "I don't think so", he said in 2005. "If there hasn't been one by now, I doubt it. I think it would be wonderful."

Nielsen briefly appeared on the World Wrestling Federation program in the summer of 1994 on WWF Monday Night Raw, capitalizing on Frank Drebin. Nielsen (and George Kennedy) were hired as sleuths to unravel the mystery of the Undertaker, who had disappeared at January's Royal Rumble event. At SummerSlam 1994, in a Naked Gun parody, they were hot on the case (in fact, they were standing on a case). Although they did not find the Undertaker, the case had been closed (the literal case had been shut), thus they solved the mystery. In 1990, Nielsen appeared as a Frank Drebin character in advertisements in the United Kingdom for Red Rock Cider.

Noncomedic roles after Airplane! included Prom Night (1980) and Creepshow (1982), both horror films, and as a dramatic and unsympathetic character in the 1986 comedy Soul Man. His last dramatic role was as Allen Green, a violent client of a prostitute killed in self-defence by Barbra Streisand's character, Claudia Draper, in Martin Ritt's courtroom drama Nuts (1987).

Later comedies
After Airplane! and The Naked Gun, Nielsen portrayed similarly styled roles in a number of other films. These mostly emulated the style of The Naked Gun with varying success and often targeted specific films; many were panned by critics and most performed poorly. Repossessed (1990) and 2001: A Space Travesty (2001) were parodies of The Exorcist and 2001: A Space Odyssey, respectively. Both attempted absurd comedy, but were poorly received. Even a leading role in a Mel Brooks comic horror, Dracula: Dead and Loving It, failed to generate much box-office excitement, although it did gain a following in a later release to video. Both 1996's Spy Hard and 1998's Wrongfully Accused, a parody of James Bond films and The Fugitive, were popular on video, but not well received by critics.

His attempt at children's comedies met additional criticism. Surf Ninjas (1993) and Mr. Magoo (1997) had scathing reviews. Several critics were disappointed that Nielsen's role in Surf Ninjas was only "an extended cameo" and Chris Hicks recommended that viewers "avoid any comedy that features Leslie Nielsen outside of the Naked Gun series." Jeff Miller of the Houston Chronicle panned Mr. Magoo, a live-action remake of the 1950s cartoon, by saying, "I'm supposed to suggest how the film might be better, but I can't think of anything to say other than to make the film again."

Nielsen's first major success since The Naked Gun came in a supporting role in Scary Movie 3 (2003). His appearance as President Harris led to a second appearance in its sequel, Scary Movie 4 (2006). This was the first time Nielsen had reprised a character since Frank Drebin. In one scene, Nielsen appeared almost nude, and one critic referred to the scene as putting "the 'scary' in Scary Movie 4."

Video, stage, and celebrity productions
Nielsen also produced instructional golf videos, which were not presented in a serious style, beginning with 1993's Bad Golf Made Easier. The videos combined comedy with golf techniques. The series spawned two additional sequels, Bad Golf My Way (1994) and Stupid Little Golf Video (1997). Nielsen also co-wrote a fictional autobiography titled The Naked Truth. The book portrayed Nielsen as a popular actor with a long history of prestigious films.

In his 80s, Nielsen performed serious roles on screen and stage (such as his one-man theatre show Darrow, in which he played Clarence Darrow), as well as providing voice-overs and appearances for commercials (including spots for a credit union in Arizona, where he owned a secondary residence), cartoons such as Zeroman, where he had the leading role/voice, children's shows, such as Pumper Pups, which he narrated, and comedic film roles. The sibling relationship with his elder brother, the Honourable Erik Nielsen, a former Deputy Prime Minister of Canada, served as the premise of an HBO mockumentary entitled The Canadian Conspiracy in which Leslie Nielsen appeared, along with other prominent Canadian-born media personalities. He was a celebrity contestant on CBS's Gameshow Marathon, where he played The Price Is Right, Let's Make a Deal, Beat the Clock, and Press Your Luck for charity.

Final acting years

Beginning in February 2007, Nielsen began playing a small role as a doctor in the humorous yet educational television show Doctor*Ology. The show chronicles real-life medical techniques and technology on the Discovery Channel. Nielsen said: "There are any number of things that you think about when you ponder if you hadn't been an actor, what would you be, and I've always said I'd like to be an astronaut or a doctor. I have such admiration for doctors. I just don't know how you go around to thank them enough for coming up with the world's most remarkable new discoveries."

In 2007, Nielsen starred in the drama Music Within. In 2008, he portrayed a version of Uncle Ben for Superhero Movie, a spoof of superhero films. He then appeared in the 2008 parody An American Carol, which David Zucker directed, produced, and co-wrote. He appeared in the 2009 parody Stan Helsing. Nielsen portrayed the doctor in the Spanish horror comedy Spanish Movie, a spoof comedy like Scary Movie, but making fun of popular Spanish films.

Nielsen appeared in more than 100 films and 1,500 television episodes, portraying more than 220 characters.

Personal life

Nielsen married four times: to nightclub singer Monica Boyar (1950–1956), Alisande Ullman (1958–1973), Brooks Oliver (1981–1983), and Barbaree Earl (2001 – his death in 2010). He had two daughters from his second marriage, Maura and Thea Nielsen.

Nielsen often played golf. He joked, "I have no goals or ambition. I do, however, wish to work enough to maintain whatever celebrity status I have so that they will continue to invite me to golf tournaments." His interest in the sport led him to comedic instructional films.

Nielsen was a practical joker, and known for pranking people with a portable hand-controlled fart machine.Cal Fussman, "What I've Learned: Interview with Leslie Nielsen", Esquire, 28 November 2010.Jim Dawson, Blame It on the Dog: A Modern History of the Fart, p.17. His epitaph reads "Let 'er rip", a final reference to his favourite practical joke.

In his later years, Nielsen and his wife Barbaree resided between homes in Fort Lauderdale, Florida and Paradise Valley, Arizona.

Nielsen was legally deaf and wore hearing aids for most of his life. Because of this, he supported the Better Hearing Institute. Later in life, Nielsen had knee osteoarthritis. He participated in an educational video from The Arthritis Research Centre of Canada (ARC), demonstrating the physical examination of a patient with knee osteoarthritis.

Illness and death

In November 2010, Nielsen was admitted to Holy Cross Hospital, Fort Lauderdale, Florida, with pneumonia. On November 28, Doug Nielsen, Nielsen's nephew, told the CJOB radio station that 84-year-old Nielsen had died in his sleep from pneumonia around 5:30 pm EST surrounded by family and friends. His body was interred in Fort Lauderdale's Evergreen Cemetery. As a final bit of humour, Nielsen chose "Let 'er rip" as his epitaph.

Achievements
Among his awards, in 1995 Nielsen received UCLA's Jack Benny Award. In 1988, he became the 1,884th personality to receive a star on the Hollywood Walk of Fame at 6541 Hollywood Blvd. In 2001 he was inducted into Canada's Walk of Fame. The following year he was made an Officer of the Order of Canada, although he was also a naturalized US citizen. 

With his American citizenship, he maintained his Canadian heritage: "There's no way you can be a Canadian and think you can lose it ... Canadians are a goodly group. They are very aware of caring and helping." On 19 May 2005, during the centennial gala of his birth province, Saskatchewan, Leslie Nielsen was introduced to Queen Elizabeth II.

In 1997, a Golden Palm Star on the Palm Springs, California, Walk of Stars was dedicated to him.

On 20 February 2002, Nielsen was named an honorary citizen of West Virginia and an Ambassador of Mountain State Goodwill. Nielsen visited the state many times to speak and visit friends. In 2003, in honour of Nielsen, Grant MacEwan College named its school of communications after him. Also in 2003, the Alliance of Canadian Cinema, Television and Radio Artists awarded him the ACTRA Award of Excellence.

Filmography

Bibliography
 1993: The Naked Truth 1995: Leslie Nielsen's Stupid Little Golf Book with Henry Beard
 1996: Bad Golf My Way'' with Henry Beard

See also

References

External links

 
 
 CBC Digital Archives – Leslie and Erik Nielsen laugh it up

1926 births
2010 deaths
20th-century American comedians
20th-century American male actors
20th-century Canadian male actors
21st-century American comedians
21st-century American male actors
21st-century Canadian male actors
American male comedians
American male deaf actors
American male film actors
American male television actors
American male voice actors
American people of Danish descent
American people of Welsh descent
American sketch comedians
Canadian emigrants to the United States
Canadian male comedians
Canadian male film actors
Canadian male television actors
Canadian male voice actors
Canadian parodists
Royal Canadian Air Force personnel of World War II
Canadian people of Danish descent
Canadian people of Welsh descent
Canadian sketch comedians
Film producers from Arizona
Deaths from pneumonia in Florida
Male actors from Phoenix, Arizona
Male actors from Regina, Saskatchewan
Male actors from the Northwest Territories
Metro-Goldwyn-Mayer contract players
Naturalized citizens of the United States
Neighborhood Playhouse School of the Theatre alumni
Officers of the Order of Canada
Royal Canadian Air Force airmen
Victoria School of Performing and Visual Arts alumni
Burials in Florida
Canadian expatriate male actors in the United States
Comedians from Saskatchewan